Karl Eduard Zachariae von Lingenthal (December 24, 1812 – June 3, 1894) was an eminent German jurist and the son of Karl Salomo Zachariae von Lingenthal.

Life
He studied philosophy, history, mathematics and linguistics, as well as jurisprudence, at Leipzig, Berlin and Heidelberg.

Having made Roman and Byzantine law his special study, he visited Paris in 1832 to examine Byzantine MSS., went in 1834 to Saint Petersburg and Copenhagen for the same purpose, and in 1835 worked in the libraries of Brussels, London, Oxford, Dublin, Edinburgh and Cambridge.

After a few months as a practising lawyer and privatdozent at Heidelberg, he went in 1837, in search of materials, to Italy and the East, visiting Athens, Constantinople and the monasteries of Mount Athos.

Having a taste for a country life, and none for teaching, he gave up his position as extraordinary professor at Heidelberg, and in 1845 bought an estate in the Prussian province of Saxony. Here he lived, engaged in scientific agriculture and interested in Prussian politics, until his death.

Works

References
Hamza, G., Comparative Law and Antiquity. Budapest, 1991. 74-80. pp.

Attribution

1812 births
1894 deaths
Jurists from Heidelberg
German untitled nobility
Members of the Prussian Academy of Sciences
Members of the Prussian House of Representatives
People from Heidelberg
People from the Grand Duchy of Baden
Leipzig University alumni
Heidelberg University alumni
Humboldt University of Berlin alumni